Justine Bayigga (born 15 January 1979 in Kayunga) is a Ugandan sprinter, who specialized in the 400 metres. Bayigga represented Uganda at the 2008 Summer Olympics in Beijing, where she competed in the women's 400 metres. She ran in the second heat, against six other athletes, including Italy's Libania Grenot, and future world-record holder Amantle Montsho of Botswana. She completed the sprint race in last place, with a time of 54.15 seconds, failing to advance into the semi-finals.

References

External links
 
NBC 2008 Olympics profile

Ugandan female sprinters
Living people
Olympic athletes of Uganda
Athletes (track and field) at the 2008 Summer Olympics
1979 births
People from Kayunga District
Commonwealth Games competitors for Uganda
Athletes (track and field) at the 1998 Commonwealth Games
Athletes (track and field) at the 2010 Commonwealth Games
Olympic female sprinters